Elephant Mountain is a mountain located in Bowdoin College Grant West (Maine Township 8, Range 10, NWP) Piscataquis County, Maine. 

Elephant Mountain stands within the watershed of the Piscataquis River, which drains into the Penobscot River, and into Penobscot Bay. 
The west side of Elephant Mtn. drains into North Brook, thence into Upper Wilson Pond, Lower Wilson Pond, Big Wilson Stream, Sebec Lake, the Sebec River, and the Piscataquis River. 
The south and southeast faces of Elephant Mtn. drain into South Brook, thence into Upper Wilson Pond. 
The northeast faces of Elephant Mtn. drains into Baker Brook, thence into Mountain Pond, Mountain Pond Brook, the West Branch of the Pleasant River, and into the Piscataquis River.

On January 24, 1963, a United States Air Force B-52 plane crashed on the mountain. There are pieces of the wreckage still on the mountain. A hiking trail leads visitors to the area of the crash, where a memorial is located.

See also 
List of mountains in Maine
The B-52 Crash on Elephant Mountain, Maine

Notes

External links 
 
  Mountainzone.com: Elephant Mountain

Mountains of Piscataquis County, Maine
Mountains of Maine